Henry Goodwin may refer to:

Henry B. Goodwin (1878–1931), Swedish photographer of German descent
Henry C. Goodwin (1824–1860), U.S. Representative from New York
Henry Martyn Goodwin (1820–1893), American minister
Henry Goodwin (musician) (1910–1979), American jazz musician

See also
Harry Goodwin (disambiguation)
Henry Godwin (disambiguation)
Henry Goodwin Smith (1860–1940), American theologian